= Kələzağ =

- Location within Azerbaijan
- Coordinates: 40°26′45″N 50°15′03″E
- Country: Azerbaijan
- City: Baku
- Time zone: UTC+4 (AZT)
  - Summer (DST): UTC+5 (AZT)

Kələzağ is a village in Baku, Azerbaijan.
